The Very Best of Emmylou Harris: Heartaches & Highways is a compilation album by American country music artist Emmylou Harris. It was released by Rhino Records on July 19, 2005. The album peaked at number 23 on the Billboard Top Country Albums chart.

Track listing

Chart performance

References

2005 compilation albums
Emmylou Harris compilation albums
Rhino Records compilation albums